The IFAF World Championship of American Football (also known as the IFAF World Cup) is an international gridiron competition held every four years and contested by teams representing member nations. The competition is run by the International Federation of American Football (IFAF), the international governing body for the sport. Seventy-one nations have a national American football team. The most recent tournament, in 2015, featured seven teams.

The defending champions are the United States, who won the 2015 championship after winning both the 2007 and 2011 editions. The U.S. team did not compete in the World Cup until 2007 and have won every tournament since. Prior to the American entrance, Japan won the 1999 and 2003 championships.

The championship was held in Italy in 1999, in Germany in 2003, in Kawasaki, Japan in 2007, and in Austria in 2011. The 2015 IFAF World Championship was originally going to be held in Stockholm, Sweden, however local organizers had to cancel the event due to lack of sponsorship. The 2015 tournament was played in Canton, Ohio, United States.

Tournament format
At the 2011 championship, the championship tournament consisted of eight teams divided into two groups of four (there were six teams in 1999 and 2007, four in 2003, and seven in 2015). The opening round featured a round-robin tournament within the groups, with each team playing each other once. However, as opposed to a tournament bracket after the games were completed, the teams with the best record from each group met in the gold medal game, with the second-place teams in each group playing for the bronze medal, the third-place teams playing in the 5th-place game, and the fourth-place teams playing in the 7th-place game, thus guaranteeing each team four games.

Automatic berths included the host nation and the defending champions. Both finalists from the European Championship of American football tournament received berths. Two teams from the Pan American Federation of American Football received berths, as did one member each from the Asian Federation of American Football and from the Oceania Federation of American Football.

For the 2019 championship (postponed to 2023, then 2025), the tournament will expand to 12 teams. Teams will be divided into four groups, each consisting of three teams. Teams will play the other two teams in their group once each, for a total of two group-stage games. Teams will then advance to the second round, and from there to the placement and medal games.

Because American football is far more dominant in the United States than anywhere else in the world, the United States did not field a team in the tournament for its first two editions. The United States has fielded a squad for the last three iterations, but with extremely restrictive criteria that make most American football players ineligible for the team. Despite the restrictions, the United States has won all three world championships in which they have competed. Similarly, Canada (where Canadian football, a related sport, has widespread popularity) did not participate until the 2011 competition, when the Canadian team finished second to the United States.

Results

Summaries

Results

Rankings

IFAF World Championship records

Rushing yards

Tournament
 447 – Lars Gustafsson, Sweden (1999)

Game
 232 – Lars Gustafsson, Sweden vs. Italy (3 July 1999)

Rushing touchdowns

Tournament
 5 – DeShawn Thomas, U.S. (2011)

Game
 3 – Mario Nerad, Australia vs. Austria (15 July 2011)

Passing yards

Tournament
 881 – Joachim Ullrich, Germany (2011)

Game
 281 – Kiernan Dorney, Australia vs. Germany (12 July 2011)

Touchdown passes

Tournament
 6 – Michael Faulds, Canada (2011)
 6 – Joachim Ullrich, Germany (2011)

Game
 4 Jared Stegman, Australia vs South Korea (9 July 2015)

Interceptions thrown

Tournament
 7 – Jarkko Nieminen, Finland (1999)

Game
 3 – Kiernan Dorney, Austria vs. Australia (15 July 2011)
 3 – Carlos Altimirano, Mexico vs. Germany (10 July 2003)
 3 – Joachim Ullrich, Germany vs. Mexico, (10 July 2003)
 3 – David Ward, Austria vs. Japan (1 July 1999)

Receiving yards

Tournament
 433 – Niklas Roemer, Germany (2011)

Game
 180 – Niklas Roemer, Germany vs France (16 July 2011)

Receptions

Tournament
 26 – Nate Kmic, U.S. (2011)

Game
 8 – Niklas Roemer, Germany vs. Austria (12 July 2011)
 8 – Nate Kmic, U.S. vs. Germany (12 July 2011)
 8 – Boti Bramer, Germany vs. Mexico (10 July 2003)

Touchdown receptions

Tournament
 4 – Niklas Roemer, Germany (2011)
 4 – Matteo Soresini, Italy (1999)

Game
 2 – by several players, most recent: Trent Steelman, U.S. vs. France (15 July 2015)

Longest plays

Rushing
 88 – N.Khandar, France vs Australia (12 July 2015)

Passing
 89 – Ullrich to Roemer, Germany vs. France (16 July 2011)

Punt return
 85 – Marcel Duft, Germany vs. Sweden (14 July 2007)

Kickoff return
 102 –  Anthony Dablé, France vs. Brazil (8 July 2015)

Interception return
 95 – Marcus Weil, Germany vs. U.S. (12 July 2007)

Fumble return
 10 Terrence Jackson, U.S. vs. Germany (7 July 2011)

Field goal
 56 – José Carlos Maltos, Mexico vs. Austria (10 July 2011)

Blocked punt return touchdown
 26 – Diezeas Calbert, U.S. vs. Australia (8 July 2011)

Blocked field goal return touchdown
 75 – Johnny Dingle, U.S. vs. Germany (10 July 2011)

See also
International Federation of American Football
IFAF Women's World Championship

References

 
IFAF
IFAF competitions
Recurring sporting events established in 1999